Lynnette, also spelled Lynette, is a feminine given name.

People
 Lynette Boggs (born 1963), American politician
 Lynnette Brooky (born 1968), New Zealand golfer
 Lynette Chico (21st century), Puerto Rican fashion model and actress
 Lynnette Cole (born 1978), Miss USA 2000
 Lynette Coleman (born 1964), Australian Paralympic athlete
 Lynette Curran (born 1945), Australian actress
Lynnette Ferguson, New Zealand academic
 Lynette Fromme (born 1948), American former prisoner
 Lynette Horsburgh (born 1974), Scottish snooker player
 Lynette Lancini (born 1970), Australian composer
 Lynette Lithgow (1950–2001), Trinidad and Tobago journalist
 Lynette Roberts (1909–1995), Welsh poet
 Lynette Sadleir (born 1963), Canadian synchronized swimmer
 Lynnette Seah (born 1957), Singaporean violinist
 Lynette Wallworth, Australian artist and filmmaker
 Lynette Washington (21st century), American jazz vocalist
 Lynette White (1967–1988), Welsh murder victim
 Lynette Woodard (born 1959), retired American basketball player
 Lynette Yiadom-Boakye (born 1977), British painter

Fictional characters
 Lynette (Arthurian character), a woman in Arthurian legend
 Linnet Oldknow, a character in Lucy M. Boston's Green Knowe series (1954–76)
 Lynette Bishop, a character in the Strike Witches anime
 Lynette Scavo, a character on the American television series Desperate Housewives (2004–2012)

See also 

 Linet (given name)

Feminine given names
English feminine given names